Anne Thérèse of Savoy (1 November 1717 – 5 April 1745) was a Savoyard princess born in Paris, France. She was the second wife of Charles de Rohan, Prince de Soubise, a military leader and friend of Louis XV. She was also a first half-cousin of Louis sharing the same grandfather Victor Amadeus II of Sardinia.

Biography
Born at the Parisian Hôtel de Soissons, she was a member of a cadet branch of the House of Savoy. Her father was the Prince di Carignano.

Through her mother, she was a granddaughter of the then king Victor Amadeus of Sicily. Her mother was Maria Vittoria Francesca, legittimata di Savoia, Marchesa di Susa, a legitimised daughter of Victor Amadeus II and his maîtresse-en-titre, Jeanne Baptiste d'Albert de Luynes.

She grew up in Paris, their parents fleeing the court of Savoy due to embarrassingly large debts. Their parents arrived in Paris during the regency of Philippe d'Orléans (1715–1723), regent of the Kingdom for the infant Louis XV.

Her husband to be was Charles de Rohan, the widower of Anne Marie Louise de La Tour d'Auvergne, a granddaughter of Marie Mancini. As head of the cadet branch of the House of Rohan, Charles bore the titles Prince de Soubise and Duke of Rohan-Rohan. He became a Marshal of France in 1758, and served as a minister to Louis XV and Louis XVI. Orphaned at the age of 9, he was a notorious libertine.

The couple married in the original (vieux) donjon of the château de Rohan in the town of Saverne on 6 November 1741. Presiding over the ceremony was the bridegroom's brother, Armand de Rohan, bishop of Strasbourg. Anne Thérèse had a step-daughter, Charlotte de Rohan, future wife of Louis Joseph de Bourbon, prince de Condé and grandmother of Louis Antoine Henri de Bourbon, Duke of Enghien, an émigré whose seizure and execution by personal order of Napoleon I would shock Europe in 1804.

Anne Thérèse died in childbirth at the Hôtel de Soubise. In December 1745, her widowed husband married again; this time to Landgravine Anna Viktoria of Hesse-Rotenburg.

Issue

Ancestry

References and notes

1717 births
1745 deaths
Nobility from Paris
Princesses of Savoy
House of Rohan
18th-century Italian people
18th-century French people
Deaths in childbirth
Princesses of Soubise
Princesses of Epinoy
Duchesses of Joyeuse
Duchesses of Rohan-Rohan